The Pleasant Grove School is a historic school building located in Logan Township, Peoria County, Illinois, near the community of Eden. The one-room schoolhouse was built in 1856 to educate the children of Pleasant Grove, the name for the surrounding community at the time. The school was built on the same property as the community's church, which has since been demolished, and its cemetery. Local stonemason Joel Lobaugh built the school from locally quarried, rough coursed limestone; his design was utilitarian, with limestone window sills and lintels being the only decorative elements. The school served students until 1945, when all of Logan Township's schools consolidated into a single school in Eden.

The school was added to the National Register of Historic Places on May 19, 1994.

References

School buildings on the National Register of Historic Places in Illinois
School buildings completed in 1856
National Register of Historic Places in Peoria County, Illinois
One-room schoolhouses in Illinois
Schools in Peoria County, Illinois